Mazaska Lake is a lake in Rice County, in the U.S. state of Minnesota.

Mazaska is a name derived from the Sioux language meaning "silver".

References

Lakes of Minnesota
Lakes of Rice County, Minnesota